Black Brook flows into Beaver Kill east of Turnwood, New York.

References 

Rivers of New York (state)
Rivers of Ulster County, New York
Tributaries of the East Branch Delaware River